The Church of Saint John is a 5th- or 6th-century Armenian Catholic church in Sohrol, Shabestar County, East Azerbaijan Province, Iran. It was rebuilt in 1840 by Samson Makintsev (Sam Khan; member of the Bogatyr Battalion) in brick on the older church foundation. It was added to the Iran National Heritage List in 1968, with the registration ID 766.

See also 
 List of Armenian churches in Iran

References

External links 
 

Armenian Catholic churches
Catholic Church in Iran
Churches in Iran
Buildings and structures in East Azerbaijan Province